"A Whole Lotta Things to Sing About" is a song written by Ben Peters, and recorded by American country music artist Charley Pride.  It was released in August 1976 as the first single from his album She's Just an Old Love Turned Memory.  The song peaked at number 2 on the Billboard Hot Country Singles chart. It also reached number 1 on the RPM Country Tracks chart in Canada.

Chart performance

References

1976 singles
Charley Pride songs
Songs written by Ben Peters
RCA Records Nashville singles
1976 songs